Slim Summerville (born George Joseph Somerville; July 10, 1892 – January 5, 1946) was an American film actor and director best known for his work in comedies.

Early life
Summerville was born in Albuquerque, New Mexico, where his mother died when he was only five.
Moving from New Mexico to Canada and later to Oklahoma, he had a nomadic upbringing. In Canada, in Chatham, Ontario, he lived with his English grandparents and obtained his first job there, working as a messenger for the Canadian Pacific Telegraphs.

Film career

The beginning of Summerville's three-decade screen career can be traced to another early job he had, one working in a poolroom in California. There in 1912 he met actor Edgar Kennedy, who took him to see Mack Sennett, the  head of Keystone Studios in Edendale. Sennett immediately hired him for $3.50 per day to perform in bit parts, his first being in the role of a "Keystone Kop" in the short Hoffmeyer's Legacy. Tall and gangly, Summerville used his physical appearance to great effect in many comedies during both the silent and sound eras. His work in films, however, was not limited to acting; he also directed more than 50 productions, mostly shorts.

Occasionally, Summerville played in dramatic films, such as All Quiet on the Western Front (1930) and Jesse James (1939), but he was most successful in comedies, including several with ZaSu Pitts. He also performed with child star Shirley Temple in the musical-comedy dramas Captain January (1936) and Rebecca of Sunnybrook Farm (1938).

Personal life
Summerville married Gertrude Martha Roell on 19 November 1927. Five years later they adopted a four-week-old baby boy whom they christened Elliott George. The couple divorced in September 1936, and the following year Summerville married Eleanor Brown, a nurse who had cared for him while he was sick.

Death
Summerville died of a stroke on January 5, 1946, in Laguna Beach, California. He is buried at Inglewood Park Cemetery in South Los Angeles community of Inglewood, California. Two decades after his death, his beach-front house on Sleepy Hollow Lane in Laguna Beach was converted into the Beach House restaurant, which was later renamed the Driftwood Kitchen.

Legacy
For his contribution to the motion picture industry, Slim Summerville has a star on the Hollywood Walk of Fame at 6409 Hollywood Blvd.

He was inducted into the New Mexico Entertainment Hall of Fame in 2012.

Selected filmography

 Hoffmeyer's Legacy (1912, Short) as Keystone Kop (uncredited)
 Mabel's Busy Day (1914, Short) as Policeman (uncredited)
 Fatty and the Heiress (1914, Short)
 A Rowboat Romance (1914, Short)
 Laughing Gas (1914, Short) as Pedestrian / Patient
 Those Happy Days (1914, Short) as Cop (uncredited)
 Lover's Luck (1914, Short) as Villager
 Dough and Dynamite (1914) as Striking Baker (uncredited)
 Tillie's Punctured Romance (1914) as Policeman / Guest in Restaurant (uncredited)
 Leading Lizzie Astray (1914, Short) as Dancing Cafe Patron (uncredited)
 Fatty's Magic Pants (1914, Short) as Cop (uncredited)
 Fatty and Minnie He-Haw (1914, Short) as Railroad Guard (uncredited)
 Fatty's New Role (1915, Short) as Bartender
 That Little Band of Gold (1915, Short) as Waiter / Audience Member (uncredited)
 Their Social Splash (1915, Short) as Harold - the Groom
 Her Painted Hero (1915, Short) as A Bill Poster
 Fatty and the Broadway Stars (1915, Short) as Striking Carpenter
 Hearts and Sparks (1916, Short) as The Moneylender's Pit Crewman
 Are Witnesses Safe? (1917)
 Skirts (1921)
 Hello, 'Frisco (1924, also directed, Short) as Slim
 The Texas Streak (1926) as Swede
 The Denver Dude (1927) as Slim Jones
 The Beloved Rogue (1927) as Jehan
 Hey! Hey! Cowboy (1927) as Spike Doolin
 Painted Ponies (1927) as Beanpole
 The Chinese Parrot (1927) as Prospector
 The Wreck of the Hesperus (1927)
 Riding for Fame (1928) as High-Pockets
 The Last Warning (1928) as Tommy Wall
 King of the Rodeo (1929) as Slim
 Strong Boy (1929) as Slim
 Sailor's Holiday (1929) as Midway Photographer (uncredited)
 One Hysterical Night (1929) as Robin Hood
 The Shannons of Broadway (1929) as Newt
 Tiger Rose (1929) as Heine
 Troopers Three (1930) as 'Sunny'
 The King of Jazz (1930) as Automobile Owner ('Springtime') / Rear End of Horse / Charles
 All Quiet on the Western Front (1930) as Tjaden
 The Little Accident (1930) as Hicks
 Under Montana Skies (1930) as Sunshine
 The Spoilers (1930) as Slapjack Simms
 Her Man (1930) as The Swede
 See America Thirst (1930) as Slim
 Free Love (1930) as Gas Inspector
 Many a Slip (1931) as Hopkins
 The Front Page (1931) as Irving Pincus
 El Tenorio del harem (1931) as El corneta
 Bad Sister (1931) as Sam
 Lasca of the Rio Grande (1931) as 'Crabapple' Thompson
 Reckless Living (1931) as The Drunk
 Heaven on Earth (1931) as The Jeweler 
 The Unexpected Father (1932) as Jasper Jones
 Racing Youth (1932) as Slim
 Tom Brown of Culver (1932) as Elmer (Slim) Whitman
 Air Mail (1932) as 'Slim' McCune
 They Just Had to Get Married (1932) as Sam Sutton
 Out All Night (1933) as Ronald Colgate
 Horse Play (1933) as Slim Perkins
 Her First Mate (1933) as John Homer
 Love, Honor, and Oh Baby! (1933) as Mark Reed
 Love Birds (1934) as Henry Whipple
 Their Big Moment (1934) as Bill Ambrose
 Life Begins at 40 (1935) as T. Watterson Meriwether
 The Farmer Takes a Wife (1935) as Fortune Friendly
 Way Down East (1935) as Constable Seth Holcomb
 The Country Doctor (1936) as Constable Jim Ogden
 Captain January (1936) as Captain Nazro
 White Fang (1936) as Slats Magee
 Pepper (1936) as Uncle Ben Jolly
 Can This Be Dixie? (1936) as Robert E. Lee Gurgle
 Reunion (1936) as Jim Ogden
 Off to the Races (1937) as Uncle George
 Love Is News (1937) as Judge Hart
 The Road Back (1937) as Tjaden
 Fifty Roads to Town (1937) as Ed Henry
 Rebecca of Sunnybrook Farm (1938) as Homer Busby
 Kentucky Moonshine (1938) as Hank Hatfield
 Five of a Kind (1938) as Jim Ogden
 Submarine Patrol (1938) as Ellsworth 'Spuds' Fickett - Cook
 Up the River (1938) as Slim Nelson
 Jesse James (1939) as Jailer
 Winner Take All (1939) as Mike Muldoon
 Charlie Chan in Reno (1939) as Sheriff Fletcher
 Henry Goes Arizona (1939) as Sheriff Parton
 Anne of Windy Poplars (1940) as Jabez Monkman
 Gold Rush Maisie (1940) as Fred Gubbins
 Western Union (1941) as Herman
 Tobacco Road (1941) as Peabody
 Puddin' Head (1941) as Uncle Lem
 Highway West (1941) as Gramps Abbott
 Niagara Falls (1941) as Sam Sawyer
 Miss Polly (1941) as Slim Wilkins
 Uncle Joe (1941) as Joe Butterworth
 The Valley of Vanishing Men (1942, Serial) as Missouri Benson
 Garden of Eatin''' (1943, Short) as Slim
 Bachelor Daze (1944, Short) as Slim Winters
 Bride by Mistake (1944) as Samuel
 Swing in the Saddle (1944) as Northup 'Slim' Bayliss
 I'm from Arkansas (1944) as Juniper Jenkins aka Pa
 Sing Me a Song of Texas (1945) as Happy
 The Hoodlum Saint'' (1946) as Eel (final film role)

References

External links

1892 births
1946 deaths
20th-century American male actors
Male actors from Albuquerque, New Mexico
American male film actors
American male silent film actors
Burials at Inglewood Park Cemetery
Male Western (genre) film actors